Tytler's leaf warbler (Phylloscopus tytleri) is a songbird species. Like all leaf warblers, it was formerly placed in the "Old World warbler" assemblage, but now belongs to the new leaf-warbler family Phylloscopidae.

It is found in Afghanistan, Pakistan, Nepal, and India. It passes through the Western Himalayas to winter in southern India, particularly in the Western Ghats and the Nilgiris.

Its natural habitat is subtropical or tropical moist montane forests. It is threatened by habitat loss. It breeds in the Northwestern Himalayan region and is suspected to breed in the Garhwal and Kumaon Himalayas.

The name commemorates the British naturalist Robert Christopher Tytler.

Identification

In museum specimens, the thin bill is clear and there is a long exposed nasal groove along the bill. The rictal bristles are short and few and the feathering at the base of the beak is reduced giving a very pointed face profile. The lower mandible is not flesh coloured in tytleri as in most trochiloides and it is not dark black as in Phylloscopus collybita tristis. They do not have any wing bars.

References

External links

Tytler's leaf warbler
Birds of Pakistan
Birds of North India
Tytler's leaf warbler
Taxonomy articles created by Polbot